WTPM (92.9 FM) is a radio station broadcasting a Religious format. Licensed to Aguadilla, Puerto Rico, it serves the Puerto Rico area.  The station is currently owned by the Corporation of the Seventh-day Adventists of West Puerto Rico.

See also 
 WZOL: Seventh-Day Adventist radio station in San Juan, Puerto Rico

External links
 WTPM website

TPM
Radio stations established in 1971
TPM (FM)
Seventh-day Adventist media
1971 establishments in Puerto Rico
Seventh-day Adventist Church in North America